Berto "Robert" DiPierdomenico (born 5 May 1958) is a retired Australian rules footballer who represented  in the Australian Football League (AFL) from the 1970s to the 1990s. Popularly known by his nickname "Dipper", DiPierdomenico is one of the most successful Italian Australians to play Australian football, and his contribution to the game was recognized by selection in the VFL/AFL Italian Team of the Century.

Early life
DiPierdomenico was born in Hawthorn to parents Stefano and Antonietta, who had emigrated to Australia from Abbateggio, Italy. DiPierdomenico's parents were married by proxy, meaning they were married over the phone.  A hyperactive child who had a stutter, Dipper attended numerous schools in Hawthorn and neighbouring areas, including Kew High, where he met his future wife Cheryl Bayley, and Swinburne Tech, where his headmaster was his future Hawthorn coach, John Kennedy Senior, DiPierdomenico began playing football in his early teens for local clubs East Hawthorn and North Kew before signing for VFL club Hawthorn as an eighteen-year-old. As a youngster, DiPierdomenico played cricket and would bowl left arm over the wrist.

AFL career
Beginning his career with the Hawthorn Football Club in 1975, DiPierdomenico started slowly, playing 99 reserve-grade games as he flitted between first team and reserve-grade football. He kick-started his career in 1978, culminating in a best-on-ground performance in the 1978 VFL Grand Final.

DiPierdomenico was initially assigned guernsey number #53, but subsequently wore number #9. Typically, he was considered one of Hawthorn's best players.

He was known for his toughness (which led to many trips to the Tribunal), and the moustachioed Dipper was one of the much-loved, and most media-covered characters in the VFL during the 1980s. DiPierdomenico won the Brownlow Medal, in 1986 tying with Greg Williams, who was playing for Sydney at the time. During that season, DiPierdomenico was considered very fortunate to have avoided the VFL tribunal, and consequent ineligibility for the Brownlow. Later in the week, he would win his third Premiership medallion as the Hawks defeated Carlton by 42 points.

Late in the first quarter of the 1989 VFL Grand Final, DiPierdomenico was running backwards to take a mark when he was met solidly from behind by Geelong star Gary Ablett. The force of the collision broke several of DiPierdomenico's ribs and punctured one of his lungs. Despite the pain, and being unaware of the extent of the damage, DiPierdomenico continued to play until the final siren. He collapsed shortly after the game and was rushed to the casualty ward of St. Vincent's Hospital, where doctors found out that DiPierdomenico had punctured a lung. He recounted the gravity of the situation years later:

"By this time I'd been shifted into intensive care. The doctor came in and said if they didn't gag me I was gone... So there you are. I had eight days in hospital to think about what might have happened. To tell you the truth, it scared me."

DiPierdomenico went on to play 240 games and kick 130 goals with the Hawks, retiring in 1991, and participating in five day and four night premierships during one of the most successful eras that a VFL/AFL club has ever achieved.

Playing statistics

|- style="background-color: #EAEAEA"
! scope="row" style="text-align:center" | 1975
|style="text-align:center;"|
| 38 || 1 || 0 || 0 || 4 || 0 || 4 || 0 ||  || 0.0 || 0.0 || 4.0 || 0.0 || 4.0 || 0.0 || 
|-
! scope="row" style="text-align:center" | 1976
|style="text-align:center;"|
| 38 || 0 || — || — || — || — || — || — || — || — || — || — || — || — || — || —
|- style="background-color: #EAEAEA"
! scope="row" style="text-align:center" | 1977
|style="text-align:center;"|
| 38 || 0 || — || — || — || — || — || — || — || — || — || — || — || — || — || —
|-
! scope="row" style="text-align:center" | 1978
|style="text-align:center;"|
| 9 || 21 || 1 || 2 || 179 || 75 || 254 || 32 ||  || 0.0 || 0.1 || 8.5 || 3.6 || 12.1 || 1.5 || 
|- style="background-color: #EAEAEA"
! scope="row" style="text-align:center" | 1979
|style="text-align:center;"|
| 9 || 15 || 1 || 2 || 170 || 87 || 257 || 49 ||  || 0.1 || 0.1 || 11.3 || 5.8 || 17.1 || 3.3 || 
|-
! scope="row" style="text-align:center" | 1980
|style="text-align:center;"|
| 9 || 16 || 2 || 2 || 191 || 96 || 287 || 43 ||  || 0.1 || 0.1 || 11.9 || 6.0 || 17.9 || 2.7 || 
|- style="background:#eaeaea;"
! scope="row" style="text-align:center" | 1981
|style="text-align:center;"|
| 9 || 12 || 5 || 4 || 127 || 45 || 172 || 36 ||  || 0.4 || 0.3 || 10.6 || 3.8 || 14.3 || 3.0 || 
|-
! scope="row" style="text-align:center" | 1982
|style="text-align:center;"|
| 9 || 9 || 3 || 2 || 67 || 37 || 104 || 23 ||  || 0.3 || 0.2 || 7.4 || 4.1 || 11.6 || 2.6 || 
|- style="background:#eaeaea;"
! scope="row" style="text-align:center;" | 1983
|style="text-align:center;"|
| 9 || 17 || 7 || 14 || 205 || 89 || 294 || 68 ||  || 0.4 || 0.8 || 12.1 || 5.2 || 17.3 || 4.0 || 
|-
! scope="row" style="text-align:center" | 1984
|style="text-align:center;"|
| 9 || 24 || 23 || 30 || 335 || 166 || 501 || 112 ||  || 1.0 || 1.3 || 14.0 || 6.9 || 20.9 || 4.7 || 
|- style="background:#eaeaea;"
! scope="row" style="text-align:center" | 1985
|style="text-align:center;"|
| 9 || 17 || 12 || 20 || 227 || 97 || 324 || 62 ||  || 0.7 || 1.2 || 13.4 || 5.7 || 19.1 || 3.6 || 
|-
! scope="row" style="text-align:center;" | 1986
|style="text-align:center;"|
| 9 || 25 || 23 || 17 || 360 || 211 || 571 || 101 ||  || 0.9 || 0.7 || 14.4 || 8.4 || 22.8 || 4.0 || 
|-style="background:#eaeaea;"
! scope="row" style="text-align:center" | 1987
|style="text-align:center;"|
| 9 || 24 || 16 || 18 || 317 || 201 || 518 || 120 || 67 || 0.7 || 0.8 || 13.2 || 8.4 || 21.6 || 5.0 || 2.8
|-
! scope="row" style="text-align:center;" | 1988
|style="text-align:center;"|
| 9 || 21 || 13 || 15 || 351 || 112 || 463 || 89 || 66 || 0.6 || 0.7 || 16.7 || 5.3 || 22.0 || 4.2 || 3.1
|-style="background:#eaeaea;"
! scope="row" style="text-align:center;" | 1989
|style="text-align:center;"|
| 9 || 24 || 19 || 18 || 353 || 142 || 495 || 96 || 70 || 0.8 || 0.8 || 14.7 || 5.9 || 20.6 || 4.0 || 2.9
|-
! scope="row" style="text-align:center" | 1990
|style="text-align:center;"|
| 9 || 13 || 5 || 5 || 180 || 76 || 256 || 61 || 18 || 0.4 || 0.4 || 13.8 || 5.8 || 19.7 || 4.7 || 1.4
|-style="background:#eaeaea;"
! scope="row" style="text-align:center" | 1991
|style="text-align:center;"|
| 9 || 1 || 0 || 3 || 11 || 4 || 15 || 0 || 2 || 0.0 || 3.0 || 11.0 || 4.0 || 15.0 || 0.0 || 2.0
|- class="sortbottom"
! colspan=3| Career
! 240
! 130
! 152
! 3077
! 1438
! 4515
! 892
! 223
! 0.5
! 0.6
! 12.8
! 6.0
! 18.8
! 3.7
! 2.7
|}

Media career

After DiPierdomenico retired, he became a popular media personality as a boundary rider with the Seven Network. After Seven lost the rights to broadcast AFL in 2001, DiPierdomenico continued his tradition as a boundary-rider on radio station 3AW. DiPierdomenico also worked at Sky News Australia as their AFL expert in the mid 2000s.

In the 1990s, DiPierdomenico made an appearance, along with Dermott Brereton and Adrian Barich, in a charity rugby league match and scored a try, and in comedic fashion dived over the line in a fashion similar to Superman to celebrate.

In 2010, he was stood down from his role in the Auskick junior development program after making a racist remark regarding Gavin Wanganeen.

DiPierdomenico made a cameo in the TV series Neighbours in 1999, and he appeared on the Channel 9 weight-loss show Excess Baggage in 2012. Since 2019, he has been hosting the TV series Dipper's Backyard BBQ Wars.

Dipierdemenico appeared in adverts for department store Dimmeys in the 1990s.

Dipper was the 7th person evicted on the seventh series of I'm a Celebrity...Get Me Out of Here! in 2021.  He is the first celebrity to bowl a strike in a sushi eating challenge.

Career highlights

 Brownlow Medal 1986 (tie)
 Australian Football Hall of Fame 2007
 VFL/AFL Italian Team of the Century

Bibliography
Butler, Ben and Binnie, Craig (2007). "Dipper's tax bill nightmare." Herald Sun. 5 September.
Cometti, Dennis (2004). Centimetre Perfect. London: Allen and Unwin.
(1991). "Dipper Decides to Call it Quits." The Advertiser. 4 October.
Edwards, Mike (2007). "Time of the essence for kids, says Dipper." Herald Sun. 13 August.
Kartal, Y (1992). "The club a party to Dipper's debut." Northern Territory News. 7 June.

References

External links

 

1958 births
Living people
Australian radio personalities
Australian rules football commentators
Australian people of Italian descent
Australian television presenters
Brownlow Medal winners
Hawthorn Football Club players
Hawthorn Football Club Premiership players
Australian rules footballers from Melbourne
Australian Football Hall of Fame inductees
Victorian State of Origin players
Australia international rules football team players
I'm a Celebrity...Get Me Out of Here! (Australian TV series) participants
Five-time VFL/AFL Premiership players
People from Hawthorn, Victoria